The 2010 Catalunya GP3 Series round was a GP3 Series motor race held on May 8 and May 9, 2010, at the Circuit de Catalunya in Montmeló, Spain. It was the first race of the 2010 GP3 Series. The race was used to support the 2010 Spanish Grand Prix.

It was also the first weekend where GP2's feeder formula GP3 made its début. All teams in GP3 use the same GP3/10 chassis and are powered by a four-cylinder 2.0 L (122 cu in) 280 bhp turbocharged engine developed by Renault Sport.

Classification

Qualifying

Feature Race

Sprint Race

Standings after the round

Drivers' Championship standings

Teams' Championship standings

 Note: Only the top five positions are included for both sets of standings.

See also 
 2010 Spanish Grand Prix
 2010 Catalunya GP2 Series round

References

External links
 GP3 Series official web site: Results

Catalunya
Catalunya GP3